Statistics of Emperor's Cup in the 1969 season.

Overview
It was contested by 8 teams, and Toyo Industries won the championship.

Results

Quarterfinals
Keio University 2–4 Furukawa Electric
Hosei University 1–6 Toyo Industries
Rikkyo University 3–3 (lottery) Yawata Steel
Meiji University 0–1 Mitsubishi Motors

Semifinals
Furukawa Electric 0–1 Toyo Industries
Rikkyo University 2–1 Mitsubishi Motors

Final

Toyo Industries 4–1 Rikkyo University
Toyo Industries won the championship.

References
 NHK

Emperor's Cup
Emperor's Cup
1970 in Japanese football